Frank Delgado (born November 29, 1970) is an American musician, best known as the keyboardist and turntablist for alternative metal band Deftones.

Musical career

Deftones
Delgado came to the attention of Deftones as a member of the Sacramento-based Hip hop group, Socialistik, a frequent opener for Deftones. He appeared as a guest performer on Deftones' first two albums, Adrenaline and Around the Fur, and was formally inaugurated into the group before their third release, White Pony.

His playing rarely features traditional scratching or beat juggling. Instead, he tends to use turntables as samplers to integrate subtle sounds and textures into the music. He prefers to create his own samples, rather than use prerecorded sample banks or borrow sounds from other artists. 

Starting with the band's eponymous fourth album, Deftones, Delgado began to put more emphasis on keyboards and synthesizers.

Other activities
Delgado is a member of the disc jockey collective Decibel Devils.

References

External links
Deftones Official Site
Deftones MySpace
Decibel Devils Official Site
Decibel Devils MySpace
Deftones Interview With Frank Delgado and Abe Cunningham

1970 births
21st-century American keyboardists
Hispanic and Latino American musicians
Living people
Musicians from Los Angeles
Deftones members
American musicians of Mexican descent
American heavy metal keyboardists
American hip hop DJs
Rock DJs